Riach is a surname. Notable people with the surname include:

Alan Riach (born 1957), Scottish poet and academic
Nancy Riach (1927–1947), Scottish swimmer
Ralph Riach (1936–2022), Scottish actor

Surnames of Scottish origin